Schwartziella chesnelii is a species of minute sea snail, a marine gastropod mollusk or micromollusk in the family Zebinidae.

Distribution
This species occurs in the Gulf of Mexico, the Caribbean Sea and the Lesser Antilles; in the Atlantic Ocean off North Carolina.

Description 
The maximum recorded shell length is 6 mm.

Habitat 
Minimum recorded depth is 4 m. Maximum recorded depth is 57 m.

References

 Rosenberg, G., F. Moretzsohn, and E. F. García. 2009. Gastropoda (Mollusca) of the Gulf of Mexico, Pp. 579–699 in Felder, D.L. and D.K. Camp (eds.), Gulf of Mexico–Origins, Waters, and Biota. Biodiversity. Texas A&M Press, College Station, Texas.

chesnelii
Gastropods described in 1830
Molluscs of the Atlantic Ocean